Dutta's Mahendragiri gecko (Hemidactylus sushilduttai) is a species of large gecko found in Andhra Pradesh in India.

It has a snout to vent length up to at least 105 mm.

References

Hemidactylus
Reptiles described in 2017
Lizards of Asia
Reptiles of India
Endemic fauna of India